Kent North is a provincial electoral district for the Legislative Assembly of New Brunswick, Canada.

The district was established in the 1973 redistribution which saw New Brunswick move from a system of plurality-at-large voting (with multi-member ridings) to a first-past-the-post voting system (with single-member ridings).  It took the northern third of the former three-member district for Kent County.  In the 1994 redistribution, it added the Rogersville area from Northumberland County and was renamed Rogersville-Kouchibouguac. In the 2006 redistribution, it lost minor territory to Kent, but it regained that territory in 2013 as well as additional territory in the Rexton and Elsipogtog areas.  Following the 2013 changes, it returned to its original name of Kent North.

Members of the Legislative Assembly

Electoral history

Kent North (2014–present)

Rogersville-Kouchibouguac

Kent North (1974–1995)

References

External links 
Website of the Legislative Assembly of New Brunswick
Map of riding as of 2018

New Brunswick provincial electoral districts